Sami Blomqvist is a Finnish professional ice hockey player who currently plays for ESV Kaufbeuren of the DEL2.

References

External links

1990 births
Living people
Lahti Pelicans players
Sportspeople from Espoo
Finnish ice hockey forwards